Herman "Isko" Salvador Jr. (born May 21, 1958), also known as Brod Pete, is a former Filipino actor and comedian. He is known for his "Ang Dating Doon" parody segment in the comedy show Bubble Gang, as a host of Celebrity Bluff, and his frequent use of the word "alien".

Early life and education
Herman Salvador was born in the municipality of Calumpit, Bulacan, Philippines. He graduated from the University of Santo Tomas in 1980 with a Bachelor of Communication Arts. He has mentioned that his idol is Dolphy, a Filipino comedian.

Career 
Salvador started his career as a scriptwriter. He began writing gags in the early 1980s. In the 1980s he was a comedy writer for the Philippine's longest-running comedy sitcom, John en Marsha, in which he also played a character named Iskô – giving rise to his stage name. After that sitcom ended, he wrote for other shows, including Plaza 1899, Home Along Da Riles, Champoy, Going Bananas, and Buddy en Sol.

Brod Pete
Salvador became a head writer for the Bubble Gang TV show in the 1990s. He achieved prominence for a segment he wrote for the show, "Ang Dating Doon", a parody religion based on the popular late-1990s Philippine religious program Ang Dating Daan (The Old Path). Salvador as Brod Pete would caricature televangelist Eliseo Soriano, as he with his co-actors Cesar Cosme (as Brother Willy) and Chito Francisco (as Brother Jocel) quoted English fairy tales and Tagalog nursery rhymes in place of religious scripture. The audience was promoted to join in a "fanatical chanting" of "Alien" instead of "Amen". Salvador's "Brod Pete" persona is a name pun on American actor Brad Pitt, as the latter's name is prone to mispronunciation with a thick Filipino accent.

In the 2007 version, the sketch was called "Doon Dati" or "Du'n Dati". In 2011 the sketch was renamed "Ang Bagong Dating Doon", focusing on questions or opinions from the other Bubble Gang cast members and fans on social media. The hosts answer the questions through song lyrics that are meanwhile being reinterpreted by Brod Pete in a more humorous way.

Salvador has also appeared as Brod Pete in various films and television shows, including Boy Pick-Up: The Movie, Pidol's Wonderland, Mr. Suave: Hoy! Hoy! Hoy! Hoy! Hoy! Hoy!, Nobody Nobody But Juan, and Klasmeyts. His Brod Pete character anchors a talk radio show, The Saturday 3 p.m. Habit with Brod Pete, on which he responds to call-in queries with wacky answers, and is a paid celebrity endorser for the Pollen-B line of health supplements.

Celebrity Bluff
Salvador is a former host of Celebrity Bluff, a Philippine game show. His role is the gangnam and his job is to help the contestants answer questions shown on the board.

Other credits
Salvador has also appeared in various sitcoms, gag shows, and films. His credits include the television shows Kapitan Awesome, John en Shirley, Love Spell, Daboy en da girl, Lastikman, Most Wanted, and the Yes! Yes! Show.

5-Minute Brod Pete Show
In September 2015, Isko Salvador launched his own online show, the 5-Minute Brod Pete Show or stylized as #5MBPS. It runs 5 minutes from Monday to Friday, and features various segments such as Internet memes, phone callers, current events, commentary, spoofs, challenges, and Q&A.

#BASA
In 2016, PSICOM Publishing Inc. published Salvador's first book "#BASA". The book contained witty gags and jokes of the comedian himself. Spoofs and scenes from his online show 5-Minute Brod Pete Show are in the book as well.

Filmography

Television

Film

References

External links

"Ang Dating Doon, Bubble Gang" (video) on YouTube

1958 births
Living people
Filipino male comedians
Filipino television personalities
Filipino male television actors
University of Santo Tomas alumni
Filipino parodists
Male actors from Bulacan
GMA Network personalities
ABS-CBN personalities
TV5 (Philippine TV network) personalities